In general relativity, the Gibbons–Hawking–York boundary term is a term that needs to be added to the Einstein–Hilbert action when the underlying spacetime manifold has a boundary.

The Einstein–Hilbert action is the basis for the most elementary variational principle from which the field equations of general relativity can be defined. However, the use of the Einstein–Hilbert action is appropriate only when the underlying spacetime manifold  is closed, i.e., a manifold which is both compact and without boundary. In the event that the manifold has a boundary , the action should be supplemented by a boundary term so that the variational principle is well-defined.

The necessity of such a boundary term was first realised by York and later refined in a minor way by Gibbons and Hawking.

For a manifold that is not closed, the appropriate action is

Varying the action with respect to the metric , subject to the condition

gives the Einstein equations; the addition of the boundary term means that in performing the variation, the geometry of the boundary encoded in the transverse metric  is fixed (see section below). There remains ambiguity in the action up to an arbitrary functional of the induced metric .

That a boundary term is needed in the gravitational case is because , the gravitational Lagrangian density, contains second derivatives of the metric tensor. This is a non-typical feature of field theories, which are usually formulated in terms of Lagrangians that involve first derivatives of fields to be varied over only.

The GHY term is desirable, as it possesses a number of other key features. When passing to the Hamiltonian formalism, it is necessary to include the GHY term in order to reproduce the correct Arnowitt–Deser–Misner energy (ADM energy). The term is required to ensure the path integral (a la Hawking) for quantum gravity has the correct composition properties. When calculating black hole entropy using the Euclidean semiclassical approach, the entire contribution comes from the GHY term. This term has had more recent applications in loop quantum gravity in calculating transition amplitudes and background-independent scattering amplitudes.

In order to determine a finite value for the action, one may have to subtract off a surface term for flat spacetime:

where  is the extrinsic curvature of the boundary imbedded flat spacetime.

Introduction to hyper-surfaces

Defining hyper-surfaces 

In a four-dimensional spacetime manifold, a hypersurface is a three-dimensional submanifold that can be either timelike, spacelike, or null.

A particular hyper-surface  can be selected either by imposing a constraint on the coordinates

or by giving parametric equations,

where  are coordinates intrinsic to the hyper-surface.

For example, a two-sphere in three-dimensional Euclidean space can be described either by

where  is the radius of the sphere, or by

Hyper-surface orthogonal vector fields 

We take the metric convention (-,+,...,+). We start with the family of hyper-surfaces given by

where different members of the family correspond to different values of the constant . We then have to first order

Subtracting off  from this equation gives

This implies that  is normal to the hyper-surface. A unit normal  can be introduced in the case where the hyper-surface is not null. This is defined by

and we require that  point in the direction of increasing . It can then easily be checked that  is given by

if the hyper-surface either spacelike or timelike.

Induced and transverse metric 

The three vectors

are tangential to the hyper-surface.

The induced metric is the three-tensor  defined by

This acts as a metric tensor on the hyper-surface in the  coordinates. For displacements confined to the hyper-surface (so that )

Because the three vectors  are tangential to the hyper-surface,

where  is the unit vector normal to the hyper-surface.

We introduce what is called the transverse metric

It isolates the part of the metric that is transverse to the normal .

It is easily seen that this four-tensor

projects out the part of a four-vector transverse to the normal  as

We have

where

Note that variation subject to the condition

On proving the main result 

In the following subsections we will first compute the variation of the Einstein–Hilbert term and then the variation of the boundary term, and show that their sum results in

where  is the Einstein tensor, which produces the correct left-hand side to the Einstein field equations, without the cosmological term, which however is trivial to include by replacing  with

where  is the cosmological constant.

In the third subsection we elaborate on the meaning of the non-dynamical term.

Variation of the Einstein–Hilbert term 

We will use the identity

and the Palatini identity:

which are both obtained in the article Einstein–Hilbert action.

We consider the variation of the Einstein–Hilbert term:

The first term gives us what we need for the left-hand side of the Einstein field equations. We must account for the second term.

By the Palatini identity

We will need Stokes theorem in the form:

And  where  where , is an invariant three-dimensional volume element on the hyper-surface. In our particular case we take .

Taking this into account we have

 
It is useful to note that

It is then not difficult to work out .

So now

As  vanishes everywhere on the boundary  its tangential derivatives must also vanish: . It follows that . So finally we have

Gathering the results we obtain

Variation of the boundary term 

We now turn to the variation of the  term.

We have

where we have use the fact that the tangential derivatives of  vanish on  We have obtained

which cancels the second integral on the right-hand side of Eq. 1. The total variation of the gravitational action is:

This produces the correct left-hand side of the Einstein equations. This proves the main result.

This result was generalised to fourth-order theories of gravity on manifolds with boundaries in 1983 and published in 1985.

The non-dynamical term 

We elaborate on the role of

in the gravitational action. As such we will refer to it as the non-dynamical term.

Let us assume that  is a solution of the vacuum field equations, in which case the Ricci scalar  vanishes. The numerical value of the gravitational action is then

where we are ignoring the non-dynamical term for the moment. Let us evaluate this for flat spacetime. We have  on the hyper-surfaces of constant time. On the three cylinder, in coordinates intrinsic to the hyper-surface, the line element is

meaning the induced metric is

so that . Then

One would expect the same problem for curved spacetimes that are asymptotically flat (there is no problem if the spacetime is compact). This problem is remedied by the non-dynamical term. The difference  will be well defined in the limit .

Variation of modified gravity terms

There are many theories which attempt to modify General Relativity in different ways, for example f(R) gravity replaces R, the Ricci scalar in the Einstein–Hilbert action with a function f(R). Guarnizo et al. found the boundary term for a general f(R) theory. 
They found that the "modified action in the metric formalism of f(R) gravity plus a Gibbons–York–Hawking like boundary term must be written as:"

where .

By using the ADM decomposition and introducing extra auxiliary fields, in 2009 Deruelle et al. found a method to find the boundary term for "gravity theories whose Lagrangian is an arbitrary function of the Riemann tensor." This method can be used to find the GHY boundary terms for Infinite derivative gravity.

A path-integral approach to quantum gravity 

As mentioned at the beginning, the GHY term is required to ensure the path integral (a la Hawking et al.) for quantum gravity has the correct composition properties.

This older approach to path-integral quantum gravity had a number of difficulties and unsolved problems. The starting point in this approach is Feynman's idea that one can represent the amplitude

We write

It is argued that one need only specify the three-dimensional induced metric  on the boundary.

Now consider the situation where one makes the transition from metric , on a surface , to a metric , on a surface  and then on to a metric  on a later surface 

One would like to have the usual composition rule

expressing that the amplitude to go from the initial to final state to be obtained by summing over all states on the intermediate surface .

Taking the implications of this into account, it can then be shown that the composition rule will hold if and only if we include the GHY boundary term.

In the next section it is demonstrated how this path integral approach to quantum gravity leads to the concept of black hole temperature and intrinsic quantum mechanical entropy.

Calculating black-hole entropy using the Euclidean semi-classical approach

Application in loop quantum gravity

Transition amplitudes and the Hamilton's principal function 

In the quantum theory, the object that corresponds to the Hamilton's principal function is the transition amplitude. Consider gravity defined on a compact region of spacetime, with the topology of a four dimensional ball. The boundary of this region is a three-dimensional space with the topology of a three-sphere, which we call . In pure gravity without cosmological constant, since the Ricci scalar vanishes on solutions of Einstein's equations, the bulk action vanishes and the Hamilton's principal function is given entirely in terms of the boundary term,

The functional  is a highly non-trivial functional to compute; this is because the extrinsic curvature  is determined by the bulk solution singled out by the boundary intrinsic geometry. As such  is non-local.

Background-independent scattering amplitudes 

Loop quantum gravity is formulated in a background-independent language. No spacetime is assumed a priori, but rather it is built up by the states of theory themselves however scattering amplitudes are derived from -point functions (Correlation function (quantum field theory)) and these, formulated in conventional quantum field theory, are functions of points of a background space-time. The relation between the background-independent formalism and the conventional formalism of quantum field theory on a given spacetime is far from obvious, and it is far from obvious how to recover low-energy quantities from the full background-independent theory. One would like to derive the -point functions of the theory from the background-independent formalism, in order to compare them with the standard perturbative expansion of quantum general relativity and therefore check that loop quantum gravity yields the correct low-energy limit.

A strategy for addressing this problem has been suggested; the idea is to study the boundary amplitude, or transition amplitude of a compact region of spacetime, namely a path integral over a finite space-time region, seen as a function of the boundary value of the field. In conventional quantum field theory, this boundary amplitude is well-defined and codes the physical information of the theory; it does so in quantum gravity as well, but in a fully background-independent manner. A generally covariant definition of -point functions can then be based on the idea that the distance between physical points arguments of the -point function is determined by the state of the gravitational field on the boundary of the spacetime region considered.

The key observation is that in gravity the boundary data include the gravitational field, hence the geometry of the boundary, hence all relevant relative distances and time separations. In other words, the boundary formulation realizes very elegantly in the quantum context the complete identification between spacetime geometry and dynamical fields.

Notes

References

External links 

 

Variational formalism of general relativity
General relativity
Lagrangian mechanics
Stephen Hawking